Cybatar is a technology company of the full cycle specialized in cloud-based technology platforms and software. 

The company was founded by Phiwa Nkambule in October 2014 initially as a social networking company but pivoted into a SaaS platform for on-demand services in 2015. Cybatar has been involved in the development of other technology startups including financial technology company Riovic. In 2015 the company announced Africa's first fuel delivery network which was received as evidence that South African entrepreneurs had embraced the idea of the On Demand Economy, and as an improvement to the Petroleum Industry value chain. In the wake of the FeesMustFall protests in South Africa, the company launched a university scholarship crowdfunding platform and campaign to save students across the country who were in tuition debt and were facing financial exclusions in 2016.

The software company also received international recognition for being lean and its technological contribution to the community in South Africa through a nomination for the African Corporate Excellence Awards 2015 under the Information Technology category. It was then named Best Cloud Computing Company - Africa in November 2015 in the awards.

See also 
 Phiwa Nkambule
 Riovic

References

External links 

 

Cloud computing providers
Software companies of South Africa
Sharing economy
Companies based in Johannesburg
Technology companies established in 2014
Software companies established in 2014